P.O.V. magazine was a New York City-based lifestyle magazine targeted at young professional men. The magazine was founded in 1995 by Drew Massey and ceased publication with its February 2000 issue. Its owner, Freedom Communications, citing increased competition as the reason for its closing.

At its peak, the magazine had an audited circulation of 360,000 and 40 employees.

P.O.V. was named by Adweek as the startup of the year in 1997.

References

Lifestyle magazines published in the United States
Men's magazines published in the United States
Defunct magazines published in the United States
Magazines established in 1995
Magazines disestablished in 2000
Magazines published in New York City